"Remains of the Day" is one of the four main songs sung in the 2005 stop-motion animated film Tim Burton's Corpse Bride. It was composed by Danny Elfman, along with all other music for the film.

The song is the second one in the movie, and vital to the plot. The character Bonejangles (voiced by Danny Elfman) introduces the song with the following lyrics: "What a story it is; a tragic tale of romance, passion and a murder most foul." Then, Bonejangles and other skeletons and corpses from the Land of the Dead sing the song with a fast and jazzy melody, and the lyrics explain how Emily, the film's titular character, died. 

In the song's storyline, Emily was a beautiful, wealthy, and talented young woman who had many suitors, one of which was a "mysterious stranger," who is later revealed in the film's climax as a murderous con-artist named Lord Barkis Bittern. While Emily admired Barkis for his supposed good personality and physical appearance, her father forbade her to marry him due to his poverty. Barkis manipulated Emily into eloping with him; Emily donned her mother's wedding dress, took her "family jewels and a satchel of gold," and went to the churchyard in the middle of the night to meet him. However, he murdered her, stole her jewels and wealth, and hid her body beneath an oak tree. In death, Emily vowed to remain there until "her true love" comes to "set her free," which Victor inadvertently does while practicing his wedding vows to marry Victoria.

Use in the soundtrack album
The song can be heard on the "Corpse Bride" soundtrack.  A notable feature on the soundtrack, on the bonus tracks, a Remains of the Day tribute to the "New Orleans style" jazz combination is played. This was used as source music in the movie.
At the end of the "End Credits" track of the soundtrack, the song's chorus is played. It is not sung, however, in the actual end credits.

Foreign versions
 The Italian version of the song is titled "Il jazz dell'aldilà" ("The Other side jazz"), although that line is not featured in the lyrics.

References

Songs written for films